Mariaan de Swardt won in the final 3–6, 7–6, 7–5 against Barbara Schett.

Seeds
A champion seed is indicated in bold text while text in italics indicates the round in which that seed was eliminated. The top two seeds received a bye to the second round.

  Amanda Coetzer (quarterfinals)
  Anke Huber (quarterfinals)
  Lisa Raymond (semifinals)
  Silvia Farina (second round)
  Elena Likhovtseva (quarterfinals)
 n/a
  Barbara Schett (final)
  Corina Morariu (quarterfinals)

Draw

Final

Section 1

Section 2

External links
 1998 Boston Cup Draw

Boston Cup
1998 WTA Tour